The first Gotabaya Rajapaksa cabinet was a central government of Sri Lanka led by President Gotabaya Rajapaksa. It was formed in November 2019 after the presidential election and ended in August 2020 following the parliamentary election.

Cabinet members
Ministers appointed under article 43(1) of the Constitution of Sri Lanka.

✝ Died while in office.

State ministers
Ministers appointed under article 44(1) of the constitution.

Notes

References

2019 establishments in Sri Lanka
2020 disestablishments in Sri Lanka
Cabinets established in 2019
Cabinets disestablished in 2020
Cabinet of Sri Lanka
Gotabaya Rajapaksa